Aleksander Zniszczoł (born 8 March 1994) is a Polish ski jumper, a member of Polish ski jumping national team, a 2014 Junior World Champion in team.

Personal life
Zniszczoł is studying at the University School of Physical Education in Katowice. On May 28, 2017, he married Magdalena Lazar. On April 6, 2018 his wife gave birth to their daughter Hanna.

Career 
In the season 2006/2007 he won the general classification Lotos Cup and the next season he was third. On July 24, 2010, he won the silver medal of the Polish Championshipsw with his club Wisla Ustronianka. On July 30, 2010, he debuted in Continental Cup in Courchevel, France, but he was 46th. On January 20, 2012, he debuted in World Cup in Zakopane, Poland and was 9th after jumping on distance – 124,5 m and 123 m. On March 3, 3012 was third in World Cup in Lahti, Finland in team competition with Maciej Kot, Kamil Stoch and Klemens Murańka. He is a three-time silver medalist of World Junior Championship from Liberec and Erzurum (twice with team and once individual) and gold medalist in team competition of World Junior Championship from Val di Fiemme 2014 with Jakub Wolny, Klemens Murańka and Krzysztof Biegun. On Friday 9 January during the training he changed his personal best 213,5 meters in Bad Mittendorf.

World championships

Individual

Aleksander Zniszczoł's starts at World Championships

World Cup

Season standings

Individual starts

References

External links
 

1994 births
Living people
People from Cieszyn
Sportspeople from Silesian Voivodeship
Polish male ski jumpers
Universiade medalists in ski jumping
Universiade gold medalists for Poland
Competitors at the 2013 Winter Universiade